The International Menopause Society (IMS) is a UK based charity. The Association was created in 1978 in Jerusalem during the second Menopause Congress and currently has members in 62 countries. In addition to organizing congresses, symposia, and workshops, the IMS owns its own journal: Climacteric, the Journal of Adult Women's Health and Medicine, published by Taylor & Francis.

Resources and publications
The Society's official journal, Climacteric, the Journal of Adult Women's Health and Medicine, was founded in 1998 and is listed in Index Medicus/MEDLINE. The Editor-in-Chief is Rodney Baber Australia. It publishes international, original, peer-reviewed research on all aspects of aging in women, especially during the menopause and climacteric. The content of the journal covers the whole range of subject areas relevant to climacteric studies and adult women’s health and medicine, including underlying endocrinological changes, treatment of the symptoms of the menopause and other age-related changes, hormone replacement therapies, alternative therapies, effective life-style modifications, non-hormonal midlife changes, and the counselling and education of perimenopausal and postmenopausal patients.

World Congress on the Menopause
The IMS hold a biennial World Congress in the different regions of the world, the 18th being held in Lisbon, Portugal in 2022 to be followed by Melbourne Australia 2024

References

External links
 IMS Official website

Menopause